Curtis Gilbert Levine (November 21, 1947 – July 31, 2012) was a Florida attorney and politician who served as a member of the  Florida House of Representatives.

Levine was born in New Britain, Connecticut on November 21, 1947.

In his first bid for reelection Levine was defeated by Irving Slosberg in the 2000 Democratic primary.

During the 2000 presidential election cycle, Levine served as the co-chair of Al Gore's Florida campaign.

Levine died in Orlando, Florida on July 31, 2012.

Notes

Sources
Florida House of Representatives Profile

External links
Website of Representative Curtis G. Levine

1947 births
2012 deaths
Democratic Party members of the Florida House of Representatives
Northeastern University alumni
Suffolk University Law School alumni
2000 United States presidential election in Florida
Politicians from New Britain, Connecticut
People from Boca Raton, Florida
Military personnel from Connecticut
Florida Attorneys General
Public defenders